Order of battle for the Battle of Taiyuan in the Second Sino-Japanese War.

Japan

North China Front Army – Gen. Juichi Terauchi 
 1st Army – Gen. Kyoji Kotouki (beginning in November)
 5th Division – Gen. Seishirō Itagaki (from September)
 9th Infantry Brigade (Brigade sent to Shanghai Nov. 1937)
 11th Infantry Regiment
 41st Infantry Regiment
 21st Infantry Brigade
 21st Infantry Regiment
 42nd Infantry Regiment
 5th Mountain Artillery Regiment
 5th Cavalry Regiment
 5th Engineer Regiment
 5th Transport Regiment
 4th? Tank Regiment/Battalion (from Sakai Bde?)
 20th Division – Gen Josaburo Kamamine (beginning in November)
 39th Infantry Brigade
 77th Infantry Regiment
 78th Infantry Regiment
 40th Infantry Brigade
 79th Infantry Regiment
 80th Infantry Regiment
 26th Field Artillery Regiment
 28th Cavalry Regiment
 20th Engineer Regiment
 20th Transport Regiment
 1st Tank Regiment/Battalion – Col. Baba***
 109th Division - ?  (beginning in November)
 31st Infantry Brigade
 69th Infantry Regiment
 107th Infantry Regiment
 118th Infantry Brigade
 119th Infantry Regiment
 136th Infantry Regiment
 109th Mountain Artillery Regt
 109th Cavalry Regiment
 109th Engineer Regiment
 109th Transport Regiment

Kwangtung Army 
 Chahar Expeditionary Force - Lt. General Hideki Tōjō
 1st Independent Mixed Brigade(Sakai Brigade)- Lt. Gen Sakai Koji +
 4th Tank Battalion
(Type 89 Med Tanks)
 1st Independent Infantry Regiment - Major Senda
 1st Independent Artillery Battalion
 1st Independent Engineer Company
 11th Independent Mixed Brigade - Gen. Shigiyasu Suzuki 
 11th Independent Infantry Regiment
 12th Independent Infantry Regiment
 11th Independent Cavalry Company
 11th Independent Field Artillery Regiment
 12th Independent Mountain Gun Regiment
 11th Independent Engineer Company
 11th Independent Transport Company
 2nd Mixed Brigade (from 1st Division, Kwangtung Army)- ?
 13th Infantry Regiment
 57th Infantry Regimen
 1st Field Artillery Regiment
 1 Company/1st Cavalry Regiment
 1 Company/1st Engineer Regiment
 1 Company/1st Transport Regiment
 15th Mixed Brigade(from 2nd Division, Kwangtung Army) - ?
 16th Infantry Regiment
 30th Infantry Regiment
 2nd Field Artillery Regiment
 1 Company/2nd Cavalry Regiment
 1 Company/2nd Engineer Regiment
 1 Company/2nd Transport Regiment
 Mongolian Army – Prince Teh Wang, Pao Yueh-ching
 1st Cavalry Division
 2nd Cavalry Division
 3rd Cavalry Division
 4th Cavalry Division
 5th Cavalry Division
 6th Cavalry Division
 7th Cavalry Division
 8th Cavalry Division

Army Airforce - ? 
 1st Daitai/16th Hiko Rentai: Ki-10
 2nd Daitai: Ki-10 Fighters	
 12th Hiko Rentai: Ki-2 bombers and Type 94 observation planes

China
2nd War Area - Yan Xishan (after first part of September 1937)
 6th Army Group – Gen. Yang Aiyuan, deputy Sun Chu
 33rd Corps - Sun Chu
 3rd Sep. Brigade - Chang Chi-yu
 8th Sep. Brigade - ?
 73rd Division  - Liu Feng-pin
 34th Corps  - Yang Cheng-yuan
 196th Brigade  - Chiang Yu-chen
 203rd Brigade  - Liang Chien-tang
 71st Division  - Kuao Tsung-fen
 New 2nd Division -  Chin Hsien-chang
 7th Army Group - Fu Zuoyi
 35th Corps  - Fu Zuoyi
 218th Brigade  - Tung Chu-wu
 211th Brigade  - Sun Lan-feng
 205th Brigade  - Tien Shu-mei
 61st Corps  - Chen Chang-Chih
 200th Brigade - Liu Tan-fu
 7th Separate Brigade  - Man Yen-shou
 101st Division  - Li Chu-kung
 17th Corps  - Kao Kuei-tse
 84st Division - Kao Kuei-tse (concurrent)
 21st Division - Li Hsien-chou
 New 2nd Brigade - An Hua-ting
 New 6th Brigade - Wang Tse-hsiu
 New 2nd Cavalry Brigade - Shih yu-shan
 6th Cavalry Corps - Men Ping-yueh
 7th Cavalry Division - Men Ping-yueh (concurrent)
 1st Temporary Cavalry Division - Feng Piao
 14th Army Group  - Wei Li-huang
 14th Corps  - Li Mo-yen(concurrent)
 10th Division  - Li Mo-yen  
 83rd Division - Li Kan
 9th Corps  - Hu Meng-lin
 47th Division - Pei Chang-hui
 54th Division - Liu Chia-chi
 85th  Division - Chen Tieh
 5th Separate Brigade  - Cheng Ting-chen
 18th Army Group  - Zhu De, deputy Peng Dehuai
 115th Division - Lin Biao
 120th Division - He Long
 129th Division - Liu Bocheng
 19th Corps  - Wang Ching-kuo
 2nd  Separate Brigade  - Fang Ke-yu
 215th Brigade  - Tu Kun
 72nd Division - Tuan Shu-hua
 66th Division  - Tu Chun-yi
 1st Cavalry Corps  - Chao Cheng-shou
 1st Cavalry Div.  - Pen Yu-pin
 2nd Cavalry Div.  - Sun Chang-sheng
 15th Corps  - Liu Mao-en
 64th  Div- Wu Ting-lin
 65th  Div- Liu Mao-en(concurrent)
 Advance Force Commander  - Ma Chan-shan
 6th Cavalry Div. - Liu Kuei-wu
 2nd Cavalry Corps - Ho Chu-kuo
 3rd Cavalry Div. - Hsu Liang
Ladies Pass Defense Group - Deputy Commander 2nd War Area, Huang Shao-hsiung
 1st Army - Sun Lien-chung
 27th Division - Fen An-pang
 30th Div. - Chang Chin-chao
 31st Div. - Chih Feng-cheng
 44th Sep. Bde - Chang Hua-tang
 3rd Corps - Tseng Wan-chung
 7th Div. - Li Shih-lung
 12th Div. - Tang Huai-yuan
 14th Army - Feng Chin-tsai
 42nd Div.  - Liu Yen-piao
 169th Div. - Wu Shih-ming
 94th Div. - Chu Huai-ping
 17th Div. -  Wu Shih-ming
 13th Corps - Tang Enbo
 4th Division - Wang Wan-ling
 89th Division - Wang Chung-lien

Airforce - ? 
 28th PS - [7 Hawk IIs ] - Captain Chan Kee-Wong from 16 September
 Up to this point, IJAAF aircraft had been able to operate freely in support of the Japanese Army in Northern China.

Chinese Force Defending Xinkow Line 

Unified Command Defending Xinkow line - Wei Li-huang
 Left Flank Army - Li Mo-yen
 14th Corps - Li Mo-yen
 10th Division - Li Mo-yen (concurrent)
 83rd Division - Li Kan
 85th Division - Chen Tieh
 66th Division - Tu Chun-yi
 71st Division - Kuao Tsung-fen
 Central Army - Wang Ching-kuo
 19th Corps - Wang Ching-kuo
 2nd Separate Brigade - Fang Ke-yu
 215th Brigade - Tu Kun
 72nd Division - Tuan Shu-hua
 35th Corps - Fu Tso-yi?
 218th Brigade - Tung Chu-wu
 211th Brigade - Sun Lan-feng
 205th Brigade - Tien Shu-mei
 61st Corps - Chen Chang-Chih
 200th Brigade - Liu Tan-fu
 7th Separate Brigade - Man Yen-shou
 101st Division - Li Chu-kung
 9th Corps - Hu Meng-lin
 47th Division - Pei Chang-hui
 54th Division - Liu Chia-chi
 Right Flank Army - Liu Mao-en
 15th Corps - Liu Mao-en
 64th Division - Wu Ting-lin
 65th Division - Liu Mao-en
 33rd Corps  - Sun Chu
 3rd Sep. Bde  - Chang Chi-yu
 8th Sep. Bde  - ?
 73rd Div.  - Liu Feng-pin
 17th Corps  - Kao Kuei-tse
 84st Div.  - Kao Kuei-tse (concurrent)
 21st Div.  - Li Hsien-chou
 5th Separate Brigade  - Cheng Ting-chen

Reference 

Second Sino-Japanese War orders of battle
Battles of the Second Sino-Japanese War